Also transliterated as "Kireevsky"
Kireyevsky (masculine), Kireyevskaya (feminine), or Kireyevskoye (neuter) may refer to:
Kireyevsky District, a district of Tula Oblast, Russia
Kireyevsky (rural locality), a rural locality (a khutor) in Volgograd Oblast, Russia
Kireyevskoye, a rural locality (a village) in Tula Oblast, Russia
Ivan Vasilyevich Kireyevsky (1806–1856) Russian literary critic and philosopher

See also
Kireyevsk, a town in Tula Oblast, Russia
Kireyevskoye-Pervoye, a rural locality (a village) in Kaluga Oblast
Kireyevskoye-Vtoroye, a rural locality (a village) in Kaluga Oblast